Feyli may refer to:

 Feyli (tribe), a tribe mainly living in the borderlands between Iraq and Iran
 Feyli (Kurdish dialect), a subdialect of Southern Kurdish

Language and nationality disambiguation pages